Naeviopsis is a genus of fungi in the family Dermateaceae. The genus contains 15 species. The genus was first established in 1976 by Bernhard Hein.

See also
 List of Dermateaceae genera

References

External links
Naeviopsis at Index Fungorum

Dermateaceae genera